Trendsetter Media and Marketing  is a music video promotion and production with offices in both New Jersey and Los Angeles. Founded by Roy LaManna in 2008, Trendsetter has worked with clients such as: Justin Bieber, Big Time Rush, Train, Bo Burnham, MTV, and Coca-Cola. In 2009, the company expanded into management with Cara Salimando.

Promotion

Production

Management 
 Cara Salimando (SRP Records/Universal Motown)
 For The Foxes (Hopeless Records)

References

External links 
 Trendsetter Media and Marketing
 Music Video Promotion

Video production companies